Frank Noah Proffitt (June 1, 1913 – November 24, 1965) was an Appalachian old time banjoist who preserved the song "Tom Dooley" in the form we know it today and was a key figure in inspiring musicians of the 1960s and 1970s to play the traditional five-string banjo.

He was born in Laurel Bloomery, Tennessee, United States, and was raised in the Reese area of Watauga County, North Carolina, where he worked in a variety of jobs and lived on a farm with his wife and six children. He grew tobacco, worked as a carpenter, and in a spark plug factory. He was known for his skills as a carpenter and luthier; Proffitt's fretless banjos and dulcimers were homemade.

In 1937, Frank Proffitt met folksong collectors Anne and Frank Warner. Frank Warner was searching for a dulcimer builder and thus began a 30-year friendship and song swapping.  Warner collected his songs and shared them with Alan Lomax, who included many, including the ballad "Tom Dooley" that Warner had learned from Proffitt, in his book, Folksong U.S.A..  Proffitt had learned the song from his aunt Nancy Prather, who had in turn learnt it from her mother Edy Adeline (Pardue) Proffitt, who had known both Dula (locally pronounced "Dooley") and Laura Foster. The Kingston Trio learned "Tom Dooley" from a recording by Warner, and were eventually required by court judgement to acknowledge their debt to Proffitt and pay him royalties for the use of the song.

Proffitt recorded "Tom Dooley" and other ballad songs in 1961, on the album Frank Proffitt Sings Folk Songs, edited by Warner and issued by Folkways Records.  A second set of Proffitt's recordings, Frank Proffitt of Reece NC: Traditional Songs and Ballads of Appalachia, was released in 1962,  and  Proffitt performed at the 1963 Newport Folk Festival. He also performed at the 1964 New York World's Fair, and recorded several more tracks released on the compilation album High Atmosphere: Ballads and Banjo Tunes from Virginia and North Carolina.

Proffitt died in 1965, aged 52.  The Frank Proffitt Memorial Album was released by Folk Legacy Records in 1969, followed by a tribute album, Nothing Seems Better To Me: The Music of Frank Proffitt and North Carolina, was issued in 2000.

Discography
Frank Proffitt Sings Folk Songs, Folkways Records
Frank Proffitt of Reese NC, Folk-Legacy Records
Frank Proffitt Memorial Album, Folk Legacy
High Atmosphere: Ballads and Banjo Tunes from Virginia and North Carolina, Rounder Records

References

1913 births
1965 deaths
People from Johnson County, Tennessee
American folk musicians
American folk singers
American banjoists
American folk-song collectors
Old-time musicians
Music of East Tennessee
Music of Johnson County, Tennessee
Musicians from Appalachia
20th-century American singers
Singer-songwriters from Tennessee
People from Beech Mountain, North Carolina